Esther Tusquets (30 August 1936 – 23 July 2012) was a Spanish publisher, novelist and essayist.

Biography 
Tusquets was born in Barcelona, Catalonia, Spain. Her brother is the architect Òscar Tusquets.

She studied philosophy, literature and history at the University of Barcelona. She spent several years teaching literature and history at the Carillo Academy. She was the director of the publishing house Lumen in Barcelona.

Tusquets published her first novel  (The Same Sea as Every Summer) in 1978. Her focus in these novels was language and the lesbian body as battlefields.

Tuquet had Parkinson's disease for several years. She died of pneumonia at the age of 75 in Barcelona on 23 July 2012.

References

External links

1936 births
2012 deaths
Writers from Barcelona
Women writers from Catalonia
Spanish women novelists
Spanish women essayists
People with Parkinson's disease
Deaths from pneumonia in Spain
20th-century Spanish novelists
20th-century Spanish women writers
20th-century essayists